Billy Drew Wade (February 28, 1930January 5, 1965) was an American stock car racing driver.

Career
Billy was the 1963 NASCAR Rookie of the Year for car owner Cotton Owens. He finished the season with 14 Top 10 finishes in 31 races. He won four consecutive races the following year for Bud Moore Engineering between July 10 and July 19, 1964. The four wins give Wade the sole distinction of being the only driver to accomplish this feat with victories at Old Bridge Stadium on July 10, the road course at Bridgehampton, N.Y on the 12th, a July 15 win at Islip Speedway in New York, and his fourth (and final) win at Watkins Glen. Dick Linder also followed his first victory at Dayton with a win at Hamburg; but Wade is the only driver to string four victories in a row once he got his first. He also accumulated five poles and 25 Top 10 finishes in his 35 starts. As of 2017, he is the most recent driver in NASCAR to get his first pole and win in the same weekend.

On January 5, 1965, Wade was performing a tire test at Daytona International Speedway, when a tire blowout caused his car to crash
in the west turn, killing the 34-year-old Texan.

Racing career results

NASCAR Grand National Series

References

External links

Webshot of newspaper article on Billy Wade

1930 births
1965 deaths
Racing drivers from Houston
NASCAR drivers
Racing drivers who died while racing
Sports deaths in Florida